Sonali Raut (born 23 December 1990) is an Indian actress and model who appears in Hindi films. She has been a Kingfisher Calendar Girl in 2010, Raut was just 19 years old college student when she featured in the Kingfisher Calendar. Raut made her acting debut with romantic-thriller film The Xpose in 2014 opposite Himesh Reshammiya and Yo Yo Honey Singh in a lead role. She was a contestant in the reality television show Bigg Boss 8.

Personal life
She is the younger sister of India's most successful overseas supermodel Ujjwala Raut. Her father is a deputy commissioner of police. She completed her graduation from Mithibai College, Mumbai.

Career

In 2010, Raut won a modeling assignment in the annual Kingfisher Calendar, which features models in swimsuits.

She was the face of many popular brands such as MAC Cosmetics, PC Chandra Jewellers, Limca, Westside, Pantaloons etc. She has also been a part of many television campaigns such as Idea with Abhishek Bachchan, Siyaram with Neil Nitin Mukesh, Seematti Sarees, iBall and many more.

In 2011 she had done a sensational photoshoot with popular actor Ranveer Singh for Maxim magazine.

In 2014, Raut starred in the Bollywood film The Xposé opposite Himesh Reshammiya and Yo Yo Honey Singh in a lead role, playing the role of a movie star who is murdered. Popular film critic Taran Adarsh from Bollywood Hungama wrote that she looked glamorous and played her role with confidence. In an interview, she described Bollywood as "not very welcoming". She dropped a commitment to be in a film entitled 99% Useless Fellows, angering the Kannada film director S. K. Basheed, to act as a contestant in the Indian reality TV show Bigg Boss.

She became one of the contestants on Bigg Boss 8 and was evicted after a surprise vote decision, but was later brought back by the Bigg Boss because of her popularity. Then she was evicted, along with Puneet Issar, after 105 days.

Raut was offered the lead role in the film Hate Story 3 and was also offered a music video to mark the success of the series, she was the first choice for the film but She turned down Hate Story 3 as she wants to do roles that she can call her own.

In 2016, Raut was seen in the film Great Grand Masti in which she played Shiney. She was also seen in the item song of the film "Lipstick Laga Ke".  The song 'Lipstick Laga Ke' had become so much popular and was one of the top 20 songs of 2016.

In the year 2017 she was signed as the cover for FFACE Fashion Calendar.

As of 2020, Raut has also signed action-thriller web series Dangerous opposite Karan Singh Grover directed by Bhushan Patel, produced by Mika Singh and written by Vikram Bhatt, The series is scheduled to stream on OTT platform MX Player from 14 August 2020.

She has also signed Music Video “Sniper” with Singer Shaan, The Song is Scheduled to release on 11 November 2020.

Filmography

Film

Web series

Music Videos

Television

References

External links 

 
 

Living people
Place of birth missing (living people)
Indian beauty pageant winners
Female models from Delhi
1990 births
Bigg Boss (Hindi TV series) contestants